Hadlow is a rural community in the Timaru District, New Zealand. It is located west of Timaru and south of Pleasant Point.

Hadlow to Harbour is an annual fun run of 3 or 10 km, depending on the route chosen. It has been operating since the 1990s. The event drew close to 1,000 people in 2020 and raised $8,000 for charity.

Demographics

Hadlow had a population of 1,434 at the 2018 New Zealand census, an increase of 162 people (12.7%) since the 2013 census, and an increase of 240 people (20.1%) since the 2006 census. There were 522 households. There were 690 males and 744 females, giving a sex ratio of 0.93 males per female. The median age was 47.3 years (compared with 37.4 years nationally), with 279 people (19.5%) aged under 15 years, 183 (12.8%) aged 15 to 29, 711 (49.6%) aged 30 to 64, and 261 (18.2%) aged 65 or older.

Ethnicities were 97.9% European/Pākehā, 5.0% Māori, 0.2% Pacific peoples, 1.0% Asian, and 0.8% other ethnicities (totals add to more than 100% since people could identify with multiple ethnicities).

The proportion of people born overseas was 11.5%, compared with 27.1% nationally.

Although some people objected to giving their religion, 47.9% had no religion, 45.4% were Christian, 0.2% were Hindu, 0.2% were Muslim and 0.6% had other religions.

Of those at least 15 years old, 258 (22.3%) people had a bachelor or higher degree, and 204 (17.7%) people had no formal qualifications. The median income was $40,100, compared with $31,800 nationally. The employment status of those at least 15 was that 630 (54.5%) people were employed full-time, 219 (19.0%) were part-time, and 21 (1.8%) were unemployed.

References

Timaru District
Populated places in Canterbury, New Zealand